The Crab is an outdoor 1962 painted steel sculpture by Alexander Calder, installed outside the Museum of Fine Arts, Houston, in the U.S. state of Texas. It measures  x  x  inches.

See also
 1962 in art
 List of Alexander Calder public works
 List of public art in Houston

References

1962 establishments in Texas
1962 sculptures
Animal sculptures in Texas
Crustaceans in art
Lillie and Hugh Roy Cullen Sculpture Garden
Sculptures by Alexander Calder
Statues in Houston
Steel sculptures in Texas